Dominic Livedoti (born November 25, 1942) is a former American football and baseball coach and college athletics administrator.

Head coaching record

College

References

External links
 Olivet Athletic Hall of Fame profile

1942 births
Living people
Baseball shortstops
Olivet Comets athletic directors
Olivet Comets baseball coaches
Olivet Comets baseball players
Olivet Comets football coaches
Olivet Comets football players
Wayne State Warriors football coaches